Angelo D'Angelo (born 18 September 1985) is an Italian footballer who plays for Cavese as a defensive midfielder.

Club career
Born in Salerno, D'Angelo spent the vast majority of his career playing for Serie D clubs, before signing to newly reformed side Avellino in December 2009. After enjoying two successive promotions (despite being only achieved due to vacancies) in his first two seasons at the Biancoverdi, he appeared 24 times and scored once during the 2012–13 season, helping the side return to Serie B after a four-year absence.

On 24 August D'Angelo made his Serie B debut, coming on as a second-half substitute in a 2–1 home win over Novara; his first goal came on 5 October, netting the game's only in a home success over Bari.

On 3 October 2020 he joined Sambenedettese on a two-year contract.

On 10 August 2021, he signed a two-year deal with Cavese in Serie D.

References

External links

1985 births
People from Salerno
Sportspeople from the Province of Salerno
Living people
Association football midfielders
Italian footballers
Serie B players
Serie C players
Serie D players
A.S.D. AVC Vogherese 1919 players
S.P.A.L. players
S.S. Turris Calcio players
U.S. Avellino 1912 players
Casertana F.C. players
A.S. Sambenedettese players
Cavese 1919 players
Footballers from Campania
21st-century Italian people